Landaulet may refer to:
 Landaulet (carriage), horse-drawn carriage
 Landaulet (car), automobile